Bonnie Garmus is an American author and former copywriter.

Garmus is from Seattle. She has worked as a copywriter and creative director in the US, and in Switzerland and Colombia.

In 2022, her debut novel, Lessons in Chemistry was published. The Guardian noted its "polished, funny, thought-provoking story ... it's hard to believe it's a debut". The New York Times commented on its "entertaining subplots and witty dialogue". As of January 2022, Lessons in Chemistry had been sold into 35 territories and has a television adaptation under way.

Garmus is married, with two daughters, and lives in London. She enjoys open water swimming and has rowed competitively.

Publications
Lessons in Chemistry, Doubleday, 2022

References

Living people
21st-century American novelists
American copywriters
Writers from Seattle
Creative directors
American women novelists
Year of birth missing (living people)